Aleksandr Yevgenyevich Pavlenko (born 20 January 1985) is a Russian football coach and a former player. He is an assistant coach with FC Rodina Moscow.

Career
Pavlenko started his career at the age of 14 in the youth academy of Dynamo Moscow before moving on to Academica Moscow and then the youth squad of FC Lausanne-Sport in Switzerland.  In 2001, at the age of 16, he signed with Spartak Moscow and made his first team debut the same year.  In 2002, he became a first team regular gaining his first opportunity to play in the UEFA Champions League.

He lost his regular place in the lineup in 2005 after injuries limited his playing time and consequently was loaned to Shinnik in 2007. He won Russian First Division player of the year accolade for his performances with Shinnik, and his team won promotion to the Premier League. After that, he has returned to Spartak and got back in the starting XI. He managed to beat a long standing Spartak midfielder Egor Titov for the starting playmaker position at the start of 2008 season. However in July Pavlenko was hospitalized with unspecified bladder problem. In March 2010 he was loaned until the end of the year to FC Rostov.

Honours 
 Russian Premier League champion (2001)
 Russian Cup winner (2003)
 Russian First Division champion (2007)
 Russian First Division player of the year (2007)

Career statistics

Notes

External links
 Aleksandr Pavlenko's personal web site 
 Club profile

1985 births
Living people
People from Pokrov, Ukraine
Russian people of Ukrainian descent
Russian footballers
Russia under-21 international footballers
Russia national football B team footballers
FC Spartak Moscow players
FC Shinnik Yaroslavl players
FC Rostov players
Russian Premier League players
FC Akhmat Grozny players
PFC Krylia Sovetov Samara players
FC Luch Vladivostok players
FC Tosno players
FC Ural Yekaterinburg players
FC Tom Tomsk players
Association football midfielders